The 2019 College Nationals is the 24th Women's College Nationals.  The College Nationals is a team handball tournament to determine the College National Champion from 2019 from the US.

Venues
The championship was played at two venues at the University of North Carolina at Chapel Hill in Chapel Hill, North Carolina.

Modus

The four teams played first a round robin. 2 × 25 min game time.

The first plays against the 4th and 2nd against the 3rd of the Group stage the semis.  2 × 25 min game time.

The losers of the semis play a small final. 2 × 30 min game time.

The winners of the semis play the final. 2 × 30 min game time.

Results

Group stage

Championship

Semifinals

Small Final

Final

Final ranking

Awards
Source:

References

External links
 Competition Page
 Second Page

USA Team Handball College Nationals by year
North Carolina Tar Heels team handball